Miss USA 1959 was the 8th Miss USA pageant, held in Long Beach, California on July 22, 1959. The pageant was won by Terry Huntingdon of California, who was crowned by outgoing titleholder Arlene Howell of Louisiana.  Huntingdon was the first woman from California to win the Miss USA title, and the first to win in her home state.  Two days after her victory, Huntingdon went on to place as 2nd runner-up at Miss Universe 1959.

Results

Historical significance 
 Alaska competes as a state for the very first time 
 California wins competition for the first time. Also becoming in the 9th state who does it for the first time. 
 Texas earns the 1st runner-up position for the first time.
 Florida earns the 2nd runner-up position for the first time.
 Georgia earns the 3rd runner-up position for the first time. 
 New York earns the 4th runner-up position for the first time.
 States that placed in semifinals the previous year were Alabama, California, Florida, Georgia, Louisiana, New York and Texas.
 Texas placed for the seventh consecutive year. 
 California and New York placed for the third consecutive year. 
 Alabama, Florida, Georgia and Louisiana made their second consecutive placement.
 Arkansas, Iowa, Maryland, Nevada and West Virginia last placed in 1957.
 Colorado last placed in 1956.
 Missouri last placed in 1954.
 Maine last placed in 1953.
 Illinois breaks an ongoing streak of placements since 1957.
 Utah breaks an ongoing streak of placements since 1956.
 Washington breaks an ongoing streak of placements since 1955.
 Nebraska and South Carolina break an ongoing streak of placements since 1953.

Delegates
The Miss USA 1959 delegates were:

 Alabama - Pat Sullivan
 Alaska - Anna Lekanof
 Arizona - Patricia Varga
 Arkansas - Donna Needham
 California - Terry Huntingdon
 Colorado - Dianne Gardner
 Connecticut - Jayne Burghardt
 Delaware - Linda Humes
 District of Columbia - Shirley Hobbs
 Florida - Nanita Greene
 Georgia - Dorothy Taylor
 Idaho - Pat Sherburne
 Illinois - Arlene Kay
 Indiana - Anita Watkins
 Iowa - Kay Nielson
 Kentucky - Sherree Watkins
 Louisiana - Mary LoBianco
 Maine - Carolyn Komant
 Maryland - Diane White
 Massachusetts - Beatrice Duprey
 Michigan - Susan Westergaard
 Minnesota - Muriel Fairbanks
 Missouri - Barbara Stell
 Montana - Bar-Beth Smith
 Nebraska - Priscilla Eckrich
 Nevada - Joy Blaine
 New Hampshire - Nancy Gray
 New Jersey - Geraldine Binder
 New Mexico - Carol Jones
 New York - Arlene Nesbitt
 North Carolina - Peggy Brown
 North Dakota - Patricia McGinley
 Ohio - Marie di Carlo
 Oklahoma - Sondra Osborne
 Pennsylvania - Rhoda Kachiko
 Rhode Island - Gloria Ryder
 South Carolina - Mary Powell
 South Dakota - Jeannine Stratton
 Tennessee - Marcia Daniel
 Texas - Carelgean Douglas
 Utah - Melanie Canfield
 Vermont - Sandra Laquerre
 Virginia - Pat Poindexter
 Washington - Leah Robinson
 West Virginia - Wilda Estep
 Wisconsin - Charlene Krause

No state delegate: Kansas, Mississippi, Oregon, Wyoming

External links 
 Miss USA official website

1959
1959 in the United States
1959 beauty pageants
1959 in California